This is a list of women writers who were born in Cuba or whose writings are closely associated with that country.

A
Alma Flor Ada (born 1938), Cuban-American writer, poet, Professor Emerita
Brígida Agüero y Agüero (1837–1866), Cuban-born poet
Mirta Aguirre (1912–1980), poet, novelist, journalist
Ginny Aiken (born 1955), Cuban-American novelist writing in English
Magaly Alabau (born 1945), Cuban-American poet, theatre director, actress, writes in Spanish
Dora Alonso (1910–2001), novelist, short story writer, poet, playwright, children's writer
María Argelia Vizcaíno (born 1955), Cuban-American historian, journalist, non-fiction writer
Cristina Ayala (1856–1936), Afro-Cuban poet

B
Ruth Behar (born 1956), Cuban-American anthropologist, poet, memoirist, non-fiction writer
Marilyn Bobes (born 1955), poet, novelist
Juana Borrero (1877–1896), painter, poet
Dulce María Borrero (1883–1945), poet, feminist

C
Lydia Cabrera (1899–1991), anthropologist, poet, non-fiction writer
Julieta Campos (1932–2007), Cuban-Mexican novelist
Yanitzia Canetti (born 1967), novelist, short story writer, children's writer, translator
Daína Chaviano (born 1957), Cuban science fiction and fantasy novelist and poet; columnist, editor, translator; now lives in the United States; writes in Spanish and English
Aurelia Castillo de González (1842–1920), writer
Domitila García Doménico de Coronado (1847–1938), considered to be the first women to practice journalism in Cuba

D
Ofelia Domínguez Navarro (1894–1976), journalist, newspaper director, feminist
Teresa Dovalpage (born 1966), novelist, playwright, living in the United States

F
María Irene Fornés (1930–2018), Cuban-American playwright, author of Fefu and Her Friends

G
Cristina García (born 1958), Cuban-American journalist, novelist
Carolina Garcia-Aguilera (born 1949), Cuban-American novelist, writes in English
Gertrudis Gómez de Avellaneda (1814–1873), letter writer, poet, novelist, playwright, political activist, lived mainly in Spain
Wendy Guerra (born 1970), poet, novelist, columnist

H
Georgina Herrera (1936–2021), Afro-Cuban poet

I
Ada Maria Isasi-Diaz (1943–2012), Cuban-American theologist, non-fiction writer

J
María Dámasa Jova Baró (1890–1940), Cuban poet and educator.

L
Carilda Oliver Labra (1922–2018), poet
Dulce María Loynaz (1902–1997), poet

M
Beatriz Maggi (1924–2017), Shakespearean scholar
Mayra Montero (born 1952), Cuban-Puerto Rican short story writer, novelist, non-fiction writer
Nancy Morejón (born 1944), poet, critic, essayist
Isabel Moya (1961–2018), journalist and feminist

N
Rafaela Chacón Nardi (1926–2001), poet and educator

O
Achy Obejas (born 1956), Cuban-American novelist, short story writer, journalist
Mirta Ojito (born 1964), Cuban-American journalist, non-fiction writer

P
Hortensia Blanch Pita (1914–2004), Cuban-born non-fiction writer, moved to Mexico
Juana Rosa Pita (born 1939), poet, translator

R
Sandra Abd'Allah-Alvarez Ramírez, Cuban blogger and activist living in Germany
Mireya Robles (born 1934), Cuban-American novelist, short story writer, critic
Mirta Rodríguez Calderón, journalist based in Santo Domingo, Dominican Republic
Ofelia Rodríguez Acosta (1902–1975), novelist, essayist, playwright, feminist
Emma Romeu, emigrated to Mexico in the early 1990s; since 1996 a non-fiction, children's, and environmental writer; writes in Spanish and English

S
Cecilia Samartin (born 1961), Cuban-American novelist, psychologist; best-selling novelist in Norway; now lives in California
Cristina Saralegui (born 1948), journalist, magazine editor, television presenter
Anna Lidia Vega Serova (born 1968), Russian-born Cuban poet, novelist, short story writer
Ana María Simo (born 1943), Cuban-American playwright, novelist, essayist
Karla Suárez (born 1969), novelist, short story writer, travel writer

T
Nivaria Tejera (1929–2016), poet, novelist

U 

 Úrsula Céspedes (1832–1874), poet

V
Zoé Valdés (born 1959), novelist, screenwriter, journalist, magazine editor
María Villar Buceta (1899–1977), poet, journalist, and librarian

W
Sylvia Wynter (born 1928), Cuban-born Jamaican novelist, playwright, critic, essayist

See also
List of Cuban writers
 List of Cuban American writers
List of women writers
List of Spanish-language authors

References

Writers
Women Writers
Cuban